The 2015 Desert Diamond Cup was a soccer exhibition featuring five soccer teams from Major League Soccer and one from USL Premier Development League, held from February 18 to February 28, 2015. It was the 5th annual Desert Diamond Cup and was won by Real Salt Lake.

Teams 
The following six clubs will participate in the 2015 tournament:
Colorado Rapids (second appearance)
Sporting Kansas City (second appearance)
New England Revolution (fourth appearance)
Real Salt Lake (fourth appearance)
Seattle Sounders FC (second appearance)
FC Tucson (third appearance)

Table standings

Matches
The tournament will feature a round-robin group stage followed by fifth-place, third-place and championship matches.

Tournament

Finals

Goalscorers

Top scorers

References 

2015
Desert Diamond Cup